Bill McCreary may refer to:

Bill McCreary Sr. (1934-2019), ice hockey player in the National Hockey League
Bill McCreary Jr. (born 1960), his son, ice hockey player in the National Hockey League
Bill McCreary (referee) (born 1955), nephew of Bill McCreary Sr., ice hockey referee in the National Hockey League